Carlo Pisacane (February 2, 1889 – June 9, 1974) was an Italian actor who performed in over 70 films, including spaghetti Westerns like Death Rides a Horse (1968) and parodies like For a Few Dollars Less (1966). He's best remembered for his appearances in comedic classics, such as Big Deal on Madonna Street and its sequel Audace colpo dei soliti ignoti, where he played the elderly and gluttonous small-time crook Capannelle. He also is known for his role as the miserly Jewish merchant Abacuc in L'Armata Brancaleone.

Selected filmography

 La Tavola dei Poveri (1932)
 Paisà (1946)
 Alarm Bells (1949)
 Processo alla città (1952)
 Un Ladro in Paradiso (1952)
 ...e Napoli canta! (1953)
 La bella mugnaia (1955)
 The Man Who Wagged His Tail (1957)
 Big Deal on Madonna Street (1958)
 Men and Noblemen (1959)
 La sceriffa (1959)
 Il raccomandato di ferro (1959)
 Prepotenti più di prima (1959)
 Un ettaro di cielo (1959)
 El Lazarillo de Tormes (1959) 
 Audace colpo dei soliti ignoti (1959)
 Il vigile (1960)
 Risate di gioia (1960)
 I piaceri dello scapolo (1960)
 Toto, Fabrizi and the Young People Today (1960)
 Che gioia vivere (1961)
 I briganti italiani (1961)
 Toto and Peppino Divided in Berlin (1962)
 Il mio amico Benito (1962)
 Colossus of the Arena (1962)
 Samson Against the Sheik (1962)
 Il giorno più corto (1962)
 Tiger of the Seven Seas (1962)
 Gli onorevoli (1963)
 Le motorizzate (1963)
 Questo pazzo, pazzo mondo della canzone (1965)
 Made in Italy (1965)
 L'Armata Brancaleone (1966)
 For a Few Dollars Less (1966)
 After the Fox (1966)
 Le Saint prend l'affût (1966)
 Treasure of San Gennaro (1966)
 Operation St. Peter's (1967)
 L'arcangelo (1969)

External links

1889 births
1974 deaths
Italian male actors